Alcedo is a hamlet and council located in the municipality of Lantarón, in Álava province, Basque Country, Spain. As of 2020, it has a population of 23.

Geography 
Alcedo is located 39km west-southwest of Vitoria-Gasteiz.

References

Populated places in Álava